Jainendra is a masculine given name. Notable people with that name include the following:

Given names
Jainendra Jain (screenwriter) (1939–2007), Indian film writer, director and producer
Jainendra K. Jain, Indian physicist
Jainendra Kumar (1905–1988), Indian writer
Jainendra Kumar (Fiji), Fijian politician

See also

Masculine given names